César Antonio Hines Céspedes  (born 13 July 1958, in Limón) is a retired Costa Rican professional footballer who played for several clubs in Costa Rica.

Captain of the national team several times, known for his powerful presence in defense and his skillfully way to kick. Called El Kaiser in reference of Franz Beckenbauer nickname.

Club career
Hines played for Limonense, Herediano, Sagrada Familia, Alajuelense, Saprissa and Curridabat.

International career
Hines made 14 appearances for the full Costa Rica national football team from 1983 to 1985, making his debut in a 1–0 victory over Guatemala on 22 October 1983. He also played at the 1984 Olympic Games. In which Costa Rica beat 1982 FIFA World Cup champions Italy 1-0 against all odds.

Retirement and personal life
Hines' early retirement was in order to achieve his other career, law. He studied law at the University of Costa Rica. At present he has a PhD in law.

His daughter Mijal plays for Costa Rica's national volleyball team.

References

1958 births
Living people
People from Limón Province
Association football defenders
Costa Rican footballers
Costa Rica international footballers
Olympic footballers of Costa Rica
Footballers at the 1984 Summer Olympics
C.S. Herediano footballers
L.D. Alajuelense footballers
Deportivo Saprissa players
20th-century Costa Rican lawyers
Liga FPD players
21st-century Costa Rican lawyers